Tsuen Wan West is situated at the west of Tsuen Wan, New Territories, Hong Kong, along Castle Peak Road between Yau Kom Tau and Chai Wan Kok. There are mainly private residential estates, including Belvedere Garden, Bayview Garden, Greenview Court, the Panorama and Serenade Cove. The largest one is Belvedere Gardens.

Previously, a bus terminus called "Tsuen Wan West Bus Terminus" was located in Tsuen Wan West, but it was later relocated to Bayview Garden after the construction of Bayview Garden was completed. Now there is still one sports centre named as "Tsuen Wan West" and called "Tsuen Wan West Sports Centre".

See also
 Castle Peak Road
 Chai Wan Kok
 Tsuen King Circuit

References